Raymond High School (RHS) is a public secondary school in Raymond, Alberta, Canada. It is the one of many schools in the County of Warner No. 5 for grades 10 through 12. The school is in the Westwind School Division and has approximately 250 students.

Sports 
Raymond High School—nicknamed the "Comets" (men and women)—has a tradition of competing in Alberta high school sports with schools that are much larger than it. Generally competing against schools that fit into the Tier I/4A Unlimited Enrollment category. While the school only averages roughly 250 students per year. Raymond High School has carved out a name for itself in High School sports across Alberta and even Canada. The 2010-11 Provincial Champion men's Football squad earned a Nationally ranked #1 spot as the best High School Football team in Canada. With their smallest margin of victory that season being 21 points. In 2008-09 Raymond Highschool won 5 Provincial Championships in 1 single school year (Men's Football, Men's and Women's basketball, Women's Rugby and Calf Roping by a single, Clay Barnson). The school has won the following Alberta Schools Athletic Association provincial championships:

Basketball

Men's basketball 
 10 Division 4A championships (most recently in 2008-09, 2010–11)

Women's basketball 
4 Division 4A championships (2004–05, 2008–09, 2013–14, 2021-2022,

Canadian football 
 3 Tier III championships (1990–91, 1991–92, 1992–93)
 8 Tier I championships (1996–97, 1997–98, 1998–99, 2005–06, 2008–09, 2009–10, 2010–11 2021-2022)

Rugby union

Women's rugby union 
 11 Tier I championships (2008–09, 2009–10, 2010–11, 2011–12, 2012–13, 2013–14 2014—15, 2016-2017, 2017-2018, 2018-2019, 2019-2020, including 7 consecutive between 2008-2015.

Noteworthy students
Earl W. Bascom, international artist and sculptor, rodeo pioneer and inventor, Canadian Rodeo Hall of Fame and Alberta Sports Hall of Fame inductee
 Ted E. Brewerton, religious leader
 Lloyd Fairbanks, professional football player
 Skousen Harker, professional basketball player
 Brett Ralph, professional Canadian football player
 Brock Ralph, professional Canadian football player
 Phil Tollestrup, professional basketball player, Olympic basketball team member, Canadian Basketball Hall of Fame inductee
 Wendy Watson Nelson, professor, author, therapist, and wife of Russell Nelson, seventeenth President of the Church of Jesus Christ of Latter-day Saints
Jimmy Ralph Professional Canadian Football Player

Graduation controversy
In 2010, Raymond High School was at the centre of a controversy in which a graduating student was told he would not be allowed to wear a kilt to the graduation ceremony. The decision made news across Canada.   After the story was reported in the news, the decision was reversed and the student was told he could wear the kilt to graduation.

Notes

High schools in Alberta
Raymond, Alberta
Buildings and structures in the County of Warner No. 5
Educational institutions in Canada with year of establishment missing